Birds are an animal group impacted by human-caused climate change. Changes to bird biology, distribution, and behaviour are among many effects of climate change, and will vary with the temperature reached over preindustrial levels.

As many birds are migratory, numerous species' phenology is likely to be impacted by changes in temperature, habitats and weather patterns. A phenological mismatch may occur, and birds' diet, breeding, and distribution may shift.

Climate change mitigation efforts such as wind farms may also impact bird species.

Background 
Anthropogenic (human-caused) global warming has raised the temperature of the Earth by about 1°C since the Industrial Revolution. Human actions are predicted to raise the temperature additionally; depending on what mitigation actions are taken, estimates range between a goal of 0.5°C to more than 2°C further warming. Higher temperatures are generally associated with more severe effects, including global drought, changing weather patterns, and increasing ocean temperatures, among many others.

Birds are a group of warm-blooded vertebrates constituting the class Aves, characterized by feathers, toothless beaked jaws, the laying of hard-shelled eggs, a high metabolic rate, a four-chambered heart, and a strong yet lightweight skeleton.

Significant work has gone into predicting the effects of climate change on birds.

Effects

Phenology 
While climate change is affecting bird phenology, and there is evidence that the phenological shifts may cause a decline in populations, no concrete connections have linked certain phenological events in a bird's year to this decline. While birds are currently adjusting their migratory timelines to contend with the stressors that climate change presents, its various and continued threats may keep phenotypic plasticity from being enough to keep phenological mismatch from threatening migratory birds.

Phenological mismatch 
One of the largest effects of climate change could be on the phenology of birds. Phenological mismatch, one of the dangers to birds that global warming presents, is the phenomenon where the timing of one aspect of a species' yearly cycle ceases to align with another aspect of their cycle where the timing of the two meetings is important to the species' ability to access resources and breed. If a bird doesn’t change its migration timing, but the timing of the highest availability of its main food source happens earlier because of warmer weather, then it will likely miss the time for resource gathering. This hasn’t been shown to have ramifications on birds' ability to breed and the survivability of offspring after breeding because reproductive success has been found to decline over the course of the breeding season for birds. Similar trends have been documented in various species of migrating Passerines. Phenological mismatch can be curbed by phenotypic plasticity, and there is debate as to the amount of impact that climate change has on phenological mismatch.

Climate change has led to a shift in the timing of spring migrations over the past 50 years. There was a widespread lengthening of migration, with the earliest individuals migrating earlier and the latest migrating at a similar time or later than before. Different species have shown different changes in migration patterns as what triggers migration can vary between species, and for some species, there is a correlation between temperatures and unexplained variations in migration timing over the short term.

Physical changes 
The color of birds might be affected by climate change. In a research study published in July 2022, scientists found that the color of Mediterranean blue tit species changed over a 15-year duration from 2005-2019. Researchers concluded that the brightness and intensity of plumage coloration might be due to a rise in temperature.

Diet 
Events such as reproduction and migration often only occur during a brief period throughout the annual cycle. For species where resource availability or quality is a key component linked to fitness, the overlap between the demand for and availability of resources is linked to fitness. For example, during energetically expensive life stages such as reproduction, the survival of offspring is often tied to seasonal prey availability. However, many prey items differ in energetic and nutritional content and are responding to climate change at different rates than bird life stages. British-breeding passerine species that have increased their lay dates and advanced spring migration arrival dates have shown more positive population trends. The pied flycatcher matches its breeding time with a peak in caterpillar populations. If the flycatcher breeds too early, then it becomes difficult to provide for its offspring, however, they have not shown a great decrease in reproductive success.

Prey availability and offspring demand 

Long-distance migrating birds are more likely to be sensitive to phenological mismatch due to the increasing inability to track changes in the breeding environment the further they migrate and the inability to be phenotypically plastic when they can gather food and breed. There is more phenological mismatch occurring during the spring migration, and species that have a greater mismatch or phenological asynchrony have more decline in populations than those that do not. Different species have different sensitivities to the changing climate and need for adjustment to migratory patterns.

Great tits have suffered population declines because the population height of their preferred food, caterpillars, and their preferred breeding time is now mismatched by at least 10 days because of global warming. Fledglings raised earlier in the season when caterpillar populations are at their peak are in better physiological condition than those raised later in the breeding season. There is a greater spread in migratory arrivals, suggesting that the birds are adjusting to this change.

King penguins are imperiled by climate change in Antarctica due to the anticipated impact on their food sources.

Range 
The range of many birds is expected to shift, generally increasing in latitude.

A 2012 study noted that "climate change forces species to move, adapt or die." That study examined house sparrows and concluded that the young were traveling further from their parents' nests in response to warming temperatures. The house sparrow was thus moving its range to escape the effects of climate change.

Human actions often compound the effects of climate change. For example, the pied crow has seen its range decrease in northern Africa but increase in southern Africa due to climate change. Climate change favors the development of forests over grasslands in southern Africa, which provides more trees for nesting. However, their increase in range and density in the south has been helped by electrical power lines. Electrical infrastructure provides additional nesting and perching sites, which may have increased the overall prevalence of the species.

Effects of mitigation 
Some climate change mitigation strategies may harm bird species. Wind farms have been found to harm species such as white-tailed eagles and whooper swans. This may be a problem of visual acuity, as most birds have a poor frontal vision. Wind turbine collisions could potentially be reduced if towers were made more conspicuous to birds, or other methods were used to scare birds away. Tidal power systems may affect wader birds.

Some mitigation strategies may also help birds. Forest management to thin forest fire fuels may increase bird habitat. Some cropping strategies for renewable biomass may increase overall species richness compared to traditional agricultural practices.

See also
 Effects of climate change on terrestrial animals
 Bird migration perils
 Bird fallout
 Bird conservation
 Season creep

References 

Effects of climate change
Ornithology
Bird migration
Birds
Birds and humans